The Glenn T. Seaborg Medal was first awarded in 1987 by the University of California, Los Angeles (UCLA), Department of Chemistry & Biochemistry to Nobel Prize–winning chemist Glenn T. Seaborg, a UCLA alumnus. The purpose of the award is to honor persons who have made exceptional scientific contributions in the fields of chemistry or biochemistry. It is awarded annually by an executive committee of the UCLA Department of Chemistry & Biochemistry.

Winners
Source:

See also

 List of chemistry awards

References

External links 
UCLA Glenn T. Seaborg Symposium

Chemistry awards
Awards established in 1987